Tiefencastel railway station is a railway station in the municipality of Tiefencastel, in the Swiss canton of Graubünden. It is an intermediate stop on the  Albula line of the Rhaetian Railway. Hourly services operate on this section of the line.

Services
The following services stop at Tiefencastel:

 Glacier Express: Several round-trips per day between Zermatt and St. Moritz.
 InterRegio: hourly service between Chur and St. Moritz.
 Regio: limited service between Chur and St. Moritz.

References

External links
 
 

Railway stations in Graubünden
Rhaetian Railway stations
Railway stations in Switzerland opened in 1903